KFOO may refer to:

 KFOO (AM), a radio station (1440 AM) licensed to serve Riverside, California, United States
 KFOO-FM, a radio station (96.1 FM) licensed to serve Opportunity, Washington, United States
 KZTM, a radio station (102.9 FM) licensed to serve McKenna, Washington, United States, which held the call sign KFOO from 2016 to 2017